Yolande Schick (née Teillet; September 28, 1927 - January 26, 2006), nicknamed Yo Yo, was a Métis-Canadian catcher who played for the All-American Girls Professional Baseball League. She both batted and threw right-handed.

Personal life
The daughter of Camille Teillet and Sara Riel, Yolande Teillet was the granddaughter of Joseph Riel, younger brother of Louis Riel. One of her brothers was Member of Parliament Roger Teillet.

She was one of the first Métis players to ever play in the United States.

She had 9 children and 21 grandchildren at the time of her death in 2006.

Baseball career
She started off by playing for the St. Vital Tigerettes in the position of catcher in the early 1940s, where she was scouted to play in the All-American Girls Professional Baseball League. She was soon after recruited to play for the Fort Wayne Daisies as an inaugural member of the team (in 1945), who came in second place that year to the Rockland Peaches. She also played for the Grand Rapids Chicks (in 1946), as well as the Kenosha Comets (in 1947), before returning home to play for the Tigerettes once again. Yolande was inducted as one of eleven female athletes from Manitoba who played in the All-American Girls league, into the National Baseball Hall of Fame in 1988, and Into the Canadian Baseball Hall of Fame and the Manitoba Baseball Hall of Fame in 1998.

Batting record

Sources

1927 births
2006 deaths
All-American Girls Professional Baseball League players
20th-century American women
People from St. Vital, Winnipeg
Riel family (Canada)
Canadian Métis people
Métis sportspeople
21st-century American women